The Odisha men's rugby union team represents Odisha in rugby union. The Odisha Rugby Football Association (ORFA), in association with India Rugby Football Union is the governing body for Odisha Men's Rugby Union Team.  Odisha is currently one of the best rugby football teams in India.

Stadium

The Odisha Rugby Football Association (ORFA) has various bases across the state of Odisha; two of the main bases are Kalinga Stadium and KIIT Stadium in Bhubaneswar.

Kit
Odisha men's team have worn dark blue, red and black for all of their Rugby Union games. At present, the shirt body is dark blue, the sleeves are red and the socks and shorts are both black.

Squad
Odisha's 26 Member Squad for 2016 All India & South Asia Rugby Tournament

Bikrant Kumar Routa (Captain)
Shanawaz Ahmed
Sambit Pradhan
Diptiranjan Khuntia
Ratnakar Hemram
Narayan Sahu
Sachin Kalah
Dibya Ranjan Dalai
Aditya Digal
Sushil Hembram
Akshay Kumar Mahanta
Bibhuti Bhusan Sethy
Santosh Sethy
Subra Narayan Mohanty
Gyanaranjan Prusti
Sananda Sagar Pradhan
Sridhar Mahalik
Balaram Jena
Prasanna Kumar Nayak
Jitendra kumar Pradhan
Sheikh Gufran
Balaram Sahu
Sushanta Behera
Priya Ranjan Rout
Kiran Kumar Jena

Administration
The following is the current organisational structure of Odisha Rugby Football Association (ORFA):

Honours 
Senior National Men's Rugby 7s Championships
 Third (2): 2013, 2021

Callaghan Cup - National Division 2 Men's Rugby XVs
 Winners (1): 2014 (KISS)
 Third (1): 2014 (Bhubaneswar)

Junior National U20 Boys 7s Championships
 Third (1): 2014 (KISS)

Junior National U20 Boys XVs Championships
 Winners (1): 2014 (KISS)

SGFI School National U19 Boys Rugby 7s
 Winners (1): 2015-16

SGFI School National U17 Boys Rugby 7s
 Runners-up (1): 2015

References

External links 
 The Official Website of Rugby India

Rugby union in India
Indian rugby union teams
Sport in Odisha